"How Can You Expect to Be Taken Seriously?" is a song by English synth-pop duo Pet Shop Boys from their fourth studio album, Behaviour (1990). It was released in the United Kingdom on 11 March 1991 as a double A-side with "Where the Streets Have No Name (I Can't Take My Eyes Off You)", serving as the third single from Behaviour.  For the single, Brothers in Rhythm remixed the track  giving it a more chilled, ambient feel compared to the New Jack Swing influences of the album version.  The track was subsequently released as a single A side in the United States and France; it peaked at number 93 on the US Billboard Hot 100. As "Being Boring" and "It's Alright" were not released in the US, tracks from these releases were used on a number of US releases. The accompanying music video received heavy rotation on MTV Europe.

Neil Tennant later said that the track "was inspired by a female pop star from 1989". Of interest to collectors, EMI USA commissioned dance DJ David Morales to create five remixes that were released to clubs and DJs on a limited promotion 12-inch. Morales would later work with the duo co-writing and co-producing the 1999 single "New York City Boy".

Track listings

"How Can You Expect to Be Taken Seriously?" was heavily remixed for single release. The version used for the music video was also released on 7-inch vinyl and cassette-single. Due to its playing time of 4:10 minutes, it is often confused with the similar "Perfect Attitude mix", which has an identical playing time, but a different introduction.

 French 7-inch and cassette single
 "How Can You Expect to Be Taken Seriously?" – 4:10
 "Where the Streets Have No Name (I Can't Take My Eyes Off You)" (7-inch edit) – 4:33

 French 12-inch single
A1. "How Can You Expect to Be Taken Seriously?" (extended mix) – 6:05
B1. "Where the Streets Have No Name (I Can't Take My Eyes Off You)" (extended mix) – 8:43
B2. "Bet She's Not Your Girlfriend" – 4:27

 French CD single
 "How Can You Expect to Be Taken Seriously?" (extended mix)
 "Where the Streets Have No Name (I Can't Take My Eyes Off You)"
 "Bet She's Not Your Girlfriend"
 "How Can You Expect to Be Taken Seriously?" (classical reprise)

 US CD single
 "How Can You Expect to Be Taken Seriously?" (original album version) – 3:54
 "How Can You Expect to Be Taken Seriously?" (7-inch Perfect Attitude mix) – 4:10
 "How Can You Expect to Be Taken Seriously?" (classical reprise) – 3:05
 "It's Alright" (7-inch mix) – 4:18
 "We All Feel Better in the Dark" – 3:59
 "Being Boring" (Marshall Jefferson 12-inch mix) – 9:03
Note: Track 4 is mislabelled as the "Trevor Horn mix"

 US 12-inch single
 "How Can You Expect to Be Taken Seriously?" (12-inch mix) – 6:03
 "How Can You Expect to Be Taken Seriously?" (7-inch Perfect Attitude mix) – 4:10
 "How Can You Expect to Be Taken Seriously?" (classical reprise) – 3:05
 "Being Boring" (12-inch mix) – 9:03
 "We All Feel Better in the Dark" – 3:59

 US cassette single
 "How Can You Expect to Be Taken Seriously?" – 3:54
 "What Have I Done to Deserve This?" – 4:17

Charts

References

1990 songs
1991 singles
Music videos directed by Liam Kan
New jack swing songs
Parlophone singles
Pet Shop Boys songs
Song recordings produced by Harold Faltermeyer
Songs written by Chris Lowe
Songs written by Neil Tennant